Harivu is a 2014 Indian Kannada language movie written & directed by debutant Manjunatha Somakeshava Reddy (S Manjunath / Mansore). A real life incident documented in a popular Kannada news paper written by Dr. Asha Benakappa  gave thoughts for making this movie.

Inspired by a true incident that took place in a Government hospital in Bengaluru in the recent years, Harivu speaks volumes about the relation between urbanization and alienation.

Harivu has won 62nd National Award for "Best Kannada Film" from Directorate of Film Festivals. The movie has won the best movie Karnataka state award for the year 2014 under "Best Production & Direction" category.

Plot
The story is based on a real-life incident. A farmer from north Karnataka brings his ailing son to Bangalore for treatment but the son dies. The farmer then faces a dilemma on how to take the body to his hometown.

Awards
The movie has won the best Kannada Film at 62nd National Film Awards for 2014 announced on 24 March 2015
 The movie has won the best movie Karnataka state award for the year 2014 under "Best Production & Direction" category.

Screening
 The movie has been screened in 7th Bengaluru International Film Festival 2014. It was also selected in the Kannada Competition category.
 Screened in  Delhi International Film Festival 2014.

References

External links
 http://harivu.com

2014 films
2010s Kannada-language films
Best Kannada Feature Film National Film Award winners